William Cunningham may refer to:

Academics and ecclesiastics
 William Cunningham (economist) (1849–1919), English economist and Archdeacon of Ely
 William Cunningham (theologian) (1805–1861), Scottish theologian
 William H. Cunningham (born ), former president of the University of Texas at Austin
 William T. Cunningham (1930–1997), American Roman Catholic priest

Noblemen
 Cunningham baronets of Cunninghamhead, Ayr in the Baronetage of Nova Scotia:
 Sir William Cunningham, 1st Baronet (died )
 Sir William Cunningham, 2nd Baronet (died 1670)
 Sir William Cunningham, 3rd Baronet (died 1724)
 William Cunningham, 3rd Earl of Glencairn, Scottish noble
 William Cunningham, 4th Earl of Glencairn (c. 1490–1547), Scottish noble
 William Cunningham, 6th Earl of Glencairn (c. 1520–c. 1578), Scottish noble
 William Cunningham, 8th Earl of Glencairn (1575–1630), Scottish noble
 William Cunningham, 9th Earl of Glencairn (1610–1664), Scottish noble

Politicians
 W. Pete Cunningham (1929–2010), American politician and soldier
 William Cunningham (Illinois politician) (born 1976), member of the Illinois Senate
 William J. Cunningham (1870–1952), Texas state senator
 William Tharp Cunningham (1871–1952), American judge and state legislator

Soldiers
 William "Bloody Bill" Cunningham (1756–1787), American Loyalist commander
 William Cunningham (lawyer) (1883–1959), New Zealand major general and lawyer

Sportsmen

Association footballers
 Bill Cunningham (footballer), Irish footballer
 William Cunningham (footballer) (1899–1934), English footballer
 Willie Cunningham (footballer, born 1925) (1925–2000), Scottish footballer
 Willie Cunningham (Northern Irish footballer) (1930–2007), also football manager

Other sportsmen
 Bill Cunningham (cricketer) (1900–1984), New Zealand cricketer
 Bill Cunningham (infielder) (1886–1946), American Major League Baseball player
 Bill Cunningham (outfielder) (1894–1953), American Major League Baseball player
 Bill Cunningham (rugby union) (1874–1927), New Zealand rugby union player
 Billy Cunningham (born 1943), American National Basketball Association Hall-of-Fame player and head coach
 W. A. Cunningham (1886–1958), American college football and basketball coach
 William Cunningham (American football) (1872–1957), American college football player
 William Cunningham (basketball) (born 1974), American professional basketball player

Others
 Bill Cunningham (American photographer) (1929–2016), American fashion photographer for The New York Times
 William Cunningham (body snatcher) (1807–1871), Irish-American body snatcher
 Bill Cunningham (musician) (born 1950), American musician, original bass guitarist / keyboardist for the Box Tops
 Bill Cunningham (talk show host) (born 1947),  American radio and television talk show host, commentator, attorney and entrepreneur
 William Meredith Cunningham (born 1901), American writer

See also
 William Cuningham, 16th-century English physician, astrologer and engraver
 Bill Cunningham (disambiguation)
 Willie Cunningham (disambiguation)
 William Cuninghame of Lainshaw (1775–1849), Scottish writer on biblical prophecy
 William Cunninghame (1731–1799), Scottish tobacco merchant
 Sir William Montgomery-Cuninghame, 9th Baronet (1834–1897), Scottish soldier, politician and Victoria Cross recipient